Brian Swift (born 2 May 1952) is a former Irish Fianna Fáil politician. A solicitor by profession, he was an unsuccessful candidate at the 1981 and November 1982 general elections. He was elected to Waterford County Council and Waterford City Council, and served as Mayor of Waterford in 1986. He was Mayor for a second term in 1998–1999.

He was elected to Dáil Éireann as a Fianna Fáil Teachta Dála (TD) for the Waterford constituency at the 1987 general election. He lost his seat at the 1989 general election.

References

1952 births
Living people
Fianna Fáil TDs
Members of the 25th Dáil
People from Waterford (city)
Irish solicitors
Mayors of Waterford
Local councillors in County Waterford